Hello Curry Pvt. Ltd. is a food delivery and restaurant company based in Hyderabad, India. The company was founded in early 2014, and in November 2015, it had 32 outlets for its food delivery operations.

Fare 
Hello Curry provides the delivery of Indian cuisine meals, which are prepared in a fast food style at partner restaurants. Fare examples of the company's delivery operations include curry dishes, raita and roti, among others. Circa September 2015, as part of its delivery operations, the company began a new product line that purveys stuffed parathas, named "Hello Paratha". For Hello Paratha products, the company partners with restaurants, who cook and delivery the food, while Hello Curry handles expenses for food and packaging. Hello Paratha products are packaged and delivered using the Hello Curry brand.

The company's opened its first dine-in restaurant, also named "Hello Curry", in Hyderabad, India in January 2015. It is a quick service restaurant, and some fare examples include butter chicken. chicken tikka, curry dishes and stuffed paratha, among others.

Acquisitions

Paratha Post 
Hello Curry acquired the Paratha Post, an Indian fast food chain, in April 2015.

TheFirstMeal 
Hello Curry acquired TheFirstMeal, an Indian FoodTech Startup, in April 2016, in a cash and stock deal, for them to enter breakfast and meal-box delivery section, and strengthen their operations in Hyderabad. TheFirstMeal was founded in 2015 by Yuv Raj Poosarla, Suraj Prakash Subedi and Saswata Shankar De. The First Meal delivered breakfast as a subscription service to users who subscribed through its website and Android, iOS and Windows apps. They collaborated with private kitchens to prepare the food and handled the packaging and delivery themselves. They were serving around 10,000 boxes a month, with 89% customer retention rate by early 2016.

References

External links 
 

Companies based in Hyderabad, India
Food and drink companies of India
Restaurants in India
Indian companies established in 2014
2014 establishments in Telangana